is a Japanese football player. He plays for Morioka Zebra.

Playing career
Ryusei Morikawa joined to FC Imabari in 2011. In 2013, he moved to Grulla Morioka. In 2016, he moved to Morioka Zebra.

References

External links

1988 births
Living people
International Pacific University alumni
Association football people from Chiba Prefecture
Japanese footballers
J3 League players
Iwate Grulla Morioka players
Association football midfielders